Grevillea whiteana, also known as Mundubbera grevillea, is an erect shrub or tree which is endemic to Queensland.

Description
The species grows to a height of between 2 and 9 metres in height. Its cream flowers are produced from early autumn to mid spring (March to October in Australia).

Taxonomy
The type specimen was obtained from Glenwood Station, 48.3 kilometres south-west of Mundubbera in 1974. By 1986 it was brought into horticulture and sold under the names Grevillea 'Munduberra' or Grevillea 'Honeycomb'. The species was formally described in 1986 by botanist Donald McGillivray, who gave it the name Grevillea whiteana, in honour of C. T. White, government botanist of Queensland from 1918 to 1950.

Distribution
The species occurs in south-east Queensland from Boondooma northward to Mundubbera and also on Mt Walsh near Biggenden.

Cultivars
The cultivar Grevillea 'Pink Surprise' is a cross between Grevillea whiteana and the red-flowering form of Grevillea banksii. It has pink flowers and grows to about 3 metres high.

References

whiteana
Flora of Queensland
Proteales of Australia
Taxa named by Donald McGillivray
Plants described in 1986